This is a list of episodes for the television series Due South.

Series overview

Episodes

Pilot (1994)

Season 1 (1994–95)

Season 2 (1995–96)

Season 3 (1997–98)

Season 4 (1998–99)

References

External links

Due South
Due South